A special election was held on November 5, 2013, to elect a senator to fill the rest of Derek Kilmer's term in the Washington State Senate representing the 26th district.

Background
The seat was left vacant after incumbent Derek Kilmer was elected to the U.S. House in November 2012. Nathan Schlicher was appointed to the seat two weeks after Derek Kilmer was sworn in.

Candidates
The election was contested between Nathan Schlicher of the Democratic Party and Jan Angel of the Republican Party, who advanced as the top two finishers in the August primary.

Results

Primary election results

General election results

Aftermath
Jan Angel won the election by about five percent, giving the Republican caucus a 24–25 minority for the 2014 session over previously having a 23-26 minority during the 2013 session.

References

Washington State Senate elections
Senate 26th
Senate 2013 26